In artificial intelligence and cognitive science, the term situated refers to an agent which is embedded in an environment. In this used, the term is used to refer to robots, but some researchers argue that software agents can also be situated if:

 they exist in a dynamic (rapidly changing) environment, which
 they can manipulate or change through their actions, and which
 they can sense or perceive.

Being situated is generally considered to be part of being embodied, but it is useful to take both perspectives.  The situated perspective emphasizes the environment and the agent's interaction s with it. These interactions define an agent's embodiment.

See also
 Robot general heading
 Cognitive agents
 Scruffies - people who tend to worry about whether their agent is situated.

References 

 Hendriks-Jansen, Horst (1996) Catching Ourselves in the Act: Situated Activity, Interactive Emergence, Evolution, and Human Thought. Cambridge, Mass.: MIT Press.

Robotics